Come Out and Play is a 2012 Mexican horror film produced, shot, edited, written, and directed by Makinov. The film stars Vinessa Shaw and Ebon Moss-Bachrach. The movie is widely know for being a box office bomb, making $2,638 USD on a MXN$12 million
(USD $940,531) budget.

Plot

Beth (Vinessa Shaw) and Francis (Ebon Moss-Bachrach), a young married couple, are on holiday together when they venture to a beautiful, but highly remote island. Beth is pregnant and the two are hoping to enjoy their last vacation before their baby is born. When they arrive, they notice that while there are plenty of children present, the adults all seem to be missing. Initially attributing this to the after effects of a recent festival, they quickly realize something far more sinister is afoot. The two will face terror and unsettling difficult decisions in their quest to make it off the island alive.

It is a remake of "Who Can Kill a Child?" (aka Island Of The Damned), a 1976 Spanish horror movie.

Cast
 Vinessa Shaw as Beth
 Ebon Moss-Bachrach as Francis
 Daniel Giménez Cacho
 Gerardo Taracena
 Alejandra Álvarez

References

External links
 
 
 

2012 films
2012 horror films
Mexican horror films
English-language Mexican films
2010s Spanish-language films
Films set in Mexico
Films shot in Mexico
Mexican independent films
Horror film remakes
Remakes of Spanish films
2010s English-language films
2012 independent films
2012 multilingual films
Mexican multilingual films
2010s Mexican films